The name Şahan derives from Persian, meaning "royal" such as "Shah of Iran". Notable people with the name include:

Given name:
 Şahan Arzruni (born 1943), Armenian pianist
 Şahan Gökbakar (born 1980), Turkish comedian

Surname:
 Olcay Şahan (born 1987), Turkish footballer

Turkish-language surnames
Turkish masculine given names